"The Sweetest Days" is the first single from Vanessa Williams' third studio album of the same name. The song was written by the same team who previously penned "Save the Best for Last" for Williams. The song was produced by Keith Thomas. It was released on October 18, 1994 by Wing Records. The single reached No. 18 on the US Billboard Hot 100 and No. 3 on the US Adult Contemporary Charts.

Critical reception
Larry Flick from Billboard described it as a "glorious pop ballad that has a slight resemblance to her Grammy-nominated hit "Save The Best For Last"." He added, "The song has a lilting and thoroughly engaging melody and a lovely, if somewhat melancholy, lyric that glistens with universal appeal. Williams is in excellent vocal form, offering a well-shaded performance amid a plush arrangement of warm strings and horns."

Music video
The video for "The Sweetest Days" is shot in two different ways. The "romantic version" was shot in an apartment overlooking a city skyline while the "urban version" shows Williams walking in a park and through streets. There are a few clips that they both share in the same spots but for the 3-minute and 31-second video, they give the song a different feel.

Track listings and formats
CD Single 851 110-2
"The Sweetest Days"
"Love Is"

CD Maxi-Single 851 113-2
"The Sweetest Days"
"What Child Is This"
"Have Yourself a Merry Little Christmas"
"Whatever Happens"

Special Collector's Edition CD Maxi-Single 851 111-2
"The Sweetest Days" – 3:31
"Love Is" – 4:44
"Save the Best for Last" – 3:39
"Dreamin'" – 5:26

Promo CD Single CDP 1330 01
"The Sweetest Days"
"The Sweetest Days" - Instrumental

Charts

Weekly charts

Year-end charts

References

1990s ballads
1994 singles
Vanessa Williams songs
Songs written by Jon Lind
Songs written by Wendy Waldman
Songs written by Phil Galdston
Pop ballads
1994 songs
Wing Records singles